Mind Wave is a studio album by Cyril Havermans.

Track listing

All songs written by Cyril Havermans

side 1

"Mind Wave (vocal)"
"Can't Go Back There"
"There's a Woman"
"Consultation Song"
"Blue Eyed Lady"

side 2

"Blue Boy"
"Fools Got You Running"
"Try to Use My Wings"
"My Time Your Dream"
"All Kind Of"
"Mind Wave (instrumental)"

Personnel

 Cyril Havermans – vocals, acoustic guitar, electric guitar
Herman Deinum – bass guitar, congas
Rudy de Queljou – lead guitar
Hans Lafaille – percussion
John D'Andrea – keyboards

Recording

John D'Andrea – producer
Tony Scotti – executive producer
Eric Prestidge – engineer

Recorded at Morgan Studios, Brussels, Belgium

Release history

References

Liner notes to Mind Wave

1974 albums
Albums with cover art by Hipgnosis
MGM Records albums